Dahiya Khap is a Khap of the Dahiya clan of Jats. which itself is a part of the Jat community in Haryana. There are more than 52 villages of Dahiya Jats in the Haryana and the Dahiya clan is the largest among the Jats of the state. Dahiya Khap is popularly known as Dahiya Chalisa. Dahiya Jats are called Dahiya Badshah in North India due to their bravery & sacrifice in History. Badshah is a Central Asian Title used for Emperors. Badshah comes from a  Persian/Farsi language word Padishah which means Emperor or Samrat. Dahiya Jats are Emperors and ruled over Iran near Caspian Sea. Dahiya or Dahae had their empire in Central Asia that's why they are called Dahiya Badshah. Some Dahiya Jats lives in Punjab.

Villages of Dahiya Jats

 Akbarpur Barota
 Anandpur
 Ashrafpur
 Badhkhalsa
 Banihari
 Barona
 Barota
 Bhadana
 Bhatgaon
 Bhowapur
 Bidhlan
 Bindhroli
 Birdhana
 Chathera
 Cholka
 Chota Khanda
 Dadam
 Daultabad
 Dhanwapur
 Gadoli
 Garhi Bala
 Garhi Hakikat
 Garhi Sisana
 Gopalpur
 Gudha
 Halalpur
 Jhinjholi
 Jharoth
 Jharothi
 Jaji
 Kakroi
 Kanwali
 Khanda Khas
 Khanda Alman
 Kheri Dahiya
 Kheri Manjat
 Khurampur
 Kidholi
 Khizarpur Jat
 Malha Majra
 Mandora
 Mandori
 Matindu
 Mor Kheri
 Mohmadabad
 Nahra
 Nahri
 Nakloi
 Naya Khanda
 Nasirpur
 Nirthan
 Nilothi
 Pelkha
 Pipli
 Pritampura
 Ratangarh
 Rohat
 Rohna
 Sehri
 Silana
 Sisana
 Shamlo Khurd
 Thana Kalan
 Thana Khurd
 Tihar Kalan
 Tihar Khurd
 Turkpur
Talwandi Bhangerian

References

Jat
Community organizing
Social history of India